Slemons is a surname. Notable people with the surname include:

 J. Morris Slemons (1879–1948), American physician
 William F. Slemons (1830–1918), American Representative from Arkansas

See also 
 2nd Arkansas Cavalry Regiment (Slemons')
 Slemon